Stowupland High School is a co-educational secondary school and sixth form situated in the Suffolk village Stowupland.

It caters for students aged 11–18 from Year 7 - Year 11 in the main school and Year 12 and 13 in the Sixth Form.

Previously a community school administered by Suffolk County Council, in September 2016 Stowupland High School converted to academy status. The school is now sponsored by the John Milton Academy Trust.

References

External links
Stowupland High School official website

Secondary schools in Suffolk
Academies in Suffolk